Alpha Delta, commonly known as AD, is a college fraternity with 6 active chapters in the United States. Alpha Delta was initially formed by 14 men representing four colleges and universities at the Henley Park Hotel in Washington, D.C. on August 4, 2007. The fraternity was founded by former Alpha Phi Omega chapters that chose to maintain all-male membership after that organization became coeducational. Alpha Delta's cardinal principles are leadership, brotherhood, and service.

History

Prior to the formation of Alpha Delta, Alpha Phi Omega was founded at Lafayette College in Easton, Pennsylvania in 1925  as a fraternal parallel to the Boy Scouts of America. This organization would go one to become one of the largest all-male, Greek-lettered college organizations in the United States, expanding to over 500 colleges and universities nationwide.

In 1972 the United States passed the Title IX educational amendments, which in effect mandated that single-sex collegiate professional and community service organizations must become coeducational, although social fraternities and sororities, as well as sex-specific youth clubs such the Boy Scouts, were specifically exempt. At the time, Alpha Phi Omega was an all-male national service fraternity and it was not clear if the amendment applied to the organization. At the 1976 national convention of Alpha Phi Omega, the fraternity voted to become coeducational in compliance with these new university rules and regulations. Several chapters threatened to disassociate with the organization if they were forced to go coeducational, so a "gentleman's agreement" was made where the national organization would not require existing chapters to admit women as members, but all new chapters to the fraternity would.

Over the following 30 years, many legislative attempts were made internally within Alpha Phi Omega to clarify national membership standards over a chapter's right to remain single-sex. In July 2005, a Board of Directors Resolution was adopted clarifying the National Fraternity's membership policies by mandating coeducational membership. The resolution was upheld at the 2006 Alpha Phi Omega National Convention in Louisville, Kentucky. Per this resolution, the all-male chapters would be required to comply with the mandate or lose national organizational recognition.

A meeting was convened by the all-male chapters at a hotel conference room in Louisville, where the Sigma Xi Chapter at the University of Maine, the Zeta Theta chapter of Drexel University, and the Pi Chi chapter of Duquesne University decided to disassociate themselves from the national organization and establish a new fraternity, Alpha Delta National Fraternity. This fraternity was later joined with the other all-male chapters, the Psi Delta Chapter at the University of Maine at Machias and the Nu Mu Chapter at the University of Minnesota at Duluth.

The Alpha Delta National Fraternity was officially founded on August 14, 2007, at the Henley Park Hotel in Washington, D.C., with fourteen men representing four of the all-male chapters present. The group adopted the Washington Convention Mission Statement, and Alpha Delta was tentatively agreed to be the acting name of the new organization. Later conventions on November 17, 2007, in Boston, Massachusetts, and on January 25, 2008, in Philadelphia, Pennsylvania, established the new national organization's ritual, constitution, bylaws, symbolism, colors, and coat of arms.  Later, the coat of arms was redesigned by Jessica Lewis, a friend of the Zeta Theta Chapter at Drexel University, and subsequently redesigned a second time by Bart Brizee of the Sigma Xi Chapter at the University of Maine.

Purpose
The purpose of Alpha Delta shall be to assemble college men in a national fraternal order as envisioned by its spiritual founder Frank Reed Horton and the Boy Scouts of America. This fraternity is dedicated to developing leadership by providing service, forging the bonds of brotherhood regardless of race, creed or background, and by developing an understanding that service to mankind is not only an obligation, but a higher calling.

Chapters
Sigma Xi – University of Maine (Est. May 15, 1967)
Zeta Theta – Drexel University (Est. May 16, 1948)
Pi Chi – Duquesne University (Est. May 15, 1966)
Psi Delta – University of Maine at Machias (Est. May 14, 1972)
Nu Mu – University of Minnesota at Duluth (Est. May 25, 1961)
Alpha Beta – Indiana University of Pennsylvania (Inactive)
Alpha Gamma - Alcorn State University (Active)

References

Fraternities and sororities in the United States
Student organizations established in 2007
2007 establishments in Washington, D.C.